The Region 1 2007 CGS Draft was held on June 12, 2007, at The Playboy Mansion in Bel Air, California.

This was the first ever draft for professional gaming, with Vanessa "Vanessa" Arteaga, being the first ever draft pick in the Championship Gaming Series.

The draft had 6 rounds with each team picking one gamer or a Counter Strike: Source team, the draft was in "snake" order meaning the team that had the first pick in the previous round will get the last pick in the next round, and vice versa.

Lottery
The lottery was held during the Combine on June 11, 2007. The draft order is as follows:

Region 1

Round One

Round Two

Round Three

Round Four

Round Five

Round Six

External links
 

Championship Gaming Series
2007 in esports